The Tuross River, an open semi-mature wave dominated barrier estuary or perennial stream, is located in the South Coast region of New South Wales, Australia.

Course and features
Tuross River rises of the eastern slopes of the Kybeyan Range, part of the Great Dividing Range, below Mount Kydra on the western edge of Wadbilliga National Park, not far from Cooma. The river flows generally north, east and northeast, joined by fourteen tributaries including the Back River and Wadbilliga rivers, before spilling into Tuross Lake and reaching its mouth at the Tasman Sea of the South Pacific Ocean at Tuross Head. The river descends  over its  course.

North of the town of Bodalla, the Princes Highway crosses the Tuross River.

Gallery

See also

 Rivers of New South Wales
 List of rivers of New South Wales (L–Z)
 List of rivers of Australia
Mordacia praecox

References

External links
 

 

Rivers of New South Wales
South Coast (New South Wales)